Ankylosaurinae is a subfamily of ankylosaurid dinosaurs, existing from the Early Cretaceous about 105 million years ago until the end of the Late Cretaceous, about 66 mya. Many genera are included in the clade, such as Ankylosaurus, Pinacosaurus, Euoplocephalus, and Saichania.

Features 
Ankylosaurines are defined as being closer relatives to Ankylosaurus than to Shamosaurus.

Diagnostic features of ankylosaurines include the nuchal shelf that obscures the occiput in dorsal view, and the quadrate condyle which is obscured lightly by the quadratojugal boss.

Phylogeny 

The following cladogram is based on the 50% majority rule phylogenetic analysis of Arbour & Currie (2015):

References 

Ankylosaurids
Cretaceous dinosaurs